The Struma Motorway is a motorway currently under construction in Bulgaria. The motorway is located in the Yugozapaden area in South West Bulgaria, and follows the route Sofia-Pernik-Dupnitsa-Blagoevgrad-Sandanski to Kulata on the border with in Greece. It is part of the Pan-European Corridor IV and also is part of Е79, that runs from Miskolc (Hungary) to Thessaloniki (Greece), via the Romanian cities of Deva and Craiova. This project is under the European Union's Ten-T Priority Projects. The road is also part of the proposed Via Carpatia route. 

The Struma motorway forms a connection between Sofia and Kulata at the Bulgaria-Greece border with a total planned length of 172.8 km. As of December 2018, about 129.46 km of the motorway, from Sofia to Blagoevgrad, and from Kresna to Kulata have already been completed and are in service.

The highway has a total width of 29 m, and has two asphalt-surfaced lanes in each direction, two emergency halt lanes, and a 3.5m median dividing lanes. 
 
The motorway is named after the Struma River. In 2018 the former Lyulin motorway was merged with the Struma motorway.

History 
The motorway has been divided into 5 construction lots: lot 0 from Pernik to Dolna Dikanya, lot 1 from Dolna Dikanya to Dupnitsa, lot 2 from Dupnitsa to Blagoevgrad, lot 3 from Blagoevgrad to Sandanski, and lot 4 from Sandanski to Kulata. The construction of lot 1 begun in September 2011 and was completed in July 2013. The construction of lot 2 begun in February 2013, and it was completed in October 2015. The construction of lot 4 begun in April 2012 and was completed in August 2015.

Lot 3.2. and Kresna Gorge environmental issue
Due to its complexity and high construction cost lot 3 has been set back to the 2014–2020 financial period and only a conceptual design had been drafted. Furthermore, it has been divided into three sub-lots — 3.1 (Blagoevgrad-Krupnik), 3.2 (Krupnik-Kresna or Kresna Gorge) and 3.3 (Kresna-Sandanski).

The design and build contract for Lot 3.3 was signed on 25 September 2015. It was completed and entered into service on December 17, 2018 at the cost of 281 million leva (144.6 million €).

Lot 3.1 is 12.6 km in length, and it is estimated to cost 186 million leva. Construction started in August 2017 and partially opened in May 2019.

Unlike Lots 3.1 and 3.3 the construction of Lot 3.2 is causing great controversy. Due to the mountain relief in this part of the country an economically viable motorway can only cut across the Kresna Gorge, a protected Natura 2000 site and a habitat of many flora and fauna endangered species. The existing roads in the Kresna Gorge already fragment it, and the current traffic, particularly on the major I-1 road cause the death of approximately 70 animals each day. Non-governmental organizations, including institutions such as Friends of the Earth Europe (FoEE), Balkani Wildlife Society, CEE Bankwatch Network, Green Policy Institute, and Centre for Environmental Information and Education, have all expressed concern through petitions, protests and studies, insisting the motorway must bypass the gorge in order to avoid further harm. Addressing all these concerns, in 2013 the government approved a 15-km long tunnel crossing the gorge to the west. The plan was met with an instant and stiff opposition from the local construction companies, and had since been shelved also due to concerns about the environmental impact of the construction works and the deposition of the excavated material from the tunnel, as well as worries about ballooning maintenance costs of the completed tunnel. An alternative plan splitting the carriageways was proposed instead. According to it the southbound carriageway would be built over the existing I-1 road, while the northbound one would be built eastwards of the gorge at the foot of the Pirin mountain. This plan, however, was also met with an opposition from the NGOs due to heavy traffic still remaining in the gorge. The plan was also opposed by hundreds small business owners whose livelihood would be affected by the decommissioning of portions of I-1 road and land expropriation.

In August 2022, the former Minister of Environment and Water Borislav Sandov stopped the project for the construction of the lot. According to him, this is necessary because the European Commission (EC) expects a new environmental impact assessment (EIA) and a new assessment of compatibility with the ecological network "Natura 2000" of the entire section to be made.

Financing
In 2012, the European Commission approved of a EUR 274 million contribution for the highway; the total investment is approximately EUR 324 million. The Liulyn Motorway was partially financed by The Instrument for Structural Policies for Pre-Accession (ISPA) and the Daskalovo-Dolna Dikanya section of the highway received a loan from the European Investment Bank (EIB).

The construction of the complete motorway is estimated to cost 1.2 billion €.

Exits

Lyulin motorway

The Lyulin motorway was a motorway in Bulgaria, that provided a link between the western arc of the Sofia ringroad and the Daskalovo interchange, at the town of Pernik, where it merged with Struma motorway (A3). It ran through mountainous terrain and needed several tunnels and many viaducts in order to avoid ecological, environmental and terrain issues.

On 8 August 2006, a contract for the construction of the motorway was signed with the Turkish consortium Mapa Cengiz for 137,381,785 euro. The construction began in 2007 and was scheduled to be finished in 38 months. However, in 2010 the initial deadline was postponed for May 2011 and the price rose to 185,000,000 euro. The Lyulin motorway was launched on 15 May 2011 and thus became the first fully operating motorway in Bulgaria.

The highway was named after the Lyulin Mountain through which it passed. The largest neighborhood of Sofia from which the highway started is also named Lyulin.

Incidents and accidents
On 17 April 2010, during construction of a concrete element of the motorway, the supporting structure holding an area where concrete was being poured collapsed, killing three workers and seriously injuring further 7. The incident occurred between 9:30pm and 10:00pm at the 13.7th kilometre of the motorway, near the village of Golyamo Buchino. Four workers were transported to Pirogov Hospital, whilst the remaining six were sent to hospital in Pernik, where two of the workers died. A third died the following day, also in Pernik. All of the casualties were working for the Turkish construction firm Mapa-Dzhengiz. A formal investigation into the cause of the accident has been launched.

On 23 November 2021, a North Macedonian bus carrying 52 passengers and 2 bus drivers crashed into a barrier on the motorway near the village of Bosnek, 44.2 km south from Sofia, while going back to the North Macedonian capital of Skopje from a weekend trip in Istanbul. The bus caught on fire before or after it crashed. 45 people, including 12 children, died in the crash, and 7 were hospitalized after escaping through the windows of the burning bus.

Gallery

Gallery

References

External links
 Lyulin motorway at Road Infrastructure Agency (in Bulgarian)

Motorways in Bulgaria
Proposed roads in Bulgaria